Menlove Ave. is a 1986 compilation album by English rock musician John Lennon. It is the second posthumous release of Lennon's music (after Milk and Honey), having been recorded during the sessions for his albums Walls and Bridges and Rock 'n' Roll. Menlove Ave. was released under the supervision of Yoko Ono, Lennon's widow.

Background
The first side of the LP comprises session outtakes from the Rock 'n' Roll sessions with Phil Spector in late 1973, apart from "Rock and Roll People", which is from the Mind Games sessions. The remainder features rehearsal recordings in mid-1974 for Walls and Bridges.

The song "Rock and Roll People" was originally recorded and released on Johnny Winter's seventh studio album John Dawson Winter III.

The title refers to Lennon's childhood home, 251 Menlove Avenue, in Liverpool. Menlove Avenue is a long road in South Liverpool, part of the Liverpool ring road. While it is mainly residential, it is also a primary route: the A562. It also passes Woolton Village where Lennon and Paul McCartney first met.

Yoko Ono's liner notes mention that "John's American rock roots – Elvis Presley, Fats Domino and Phil Spector – are evident in these tracks. But what I hear in John's voice are the other roots of the boy who grew up in Liverpool, listening to 'Greensleeves,' BBC Radio and Tessie O'Shea."

Album cover
The artwork for the release was effected by artist Andy Warhol, just months before Lennon's death in 1980. It was later used as the cover for the 2005 compilation album Working Class Hero: The Definitive Lennon.

Reception and aftermath
Though Menlove Ave. included previously unreleased material of John Lennon, it failed to chart in the United Kingdom. It did manage to reach number 127 in the United States, making it Lennon's least-successful album. Menlove Ave. was issued on CD in 1987, and remains available from Capitol Records in that format.

Side 1, tracks 3–5 appeared as bonus tracks on the 2004 remastered version of Rock 'n' Roll.  The song "Here We Go Again" was included on the 2006 soundtrack album The U.S. vs. John Lennon and 2010 box set Gimme Some Truth.

The album is the only one of Lennon's not available on music streaming platforms.

Track listing

Notes
 Side 1, tracks 1 and 3–5 were recorded in late 1973.
 Side 1, track 2 was recorded mid-1973 for, but left off of Mind Games.
 Side 2, tracks 1–5 are mid-1974 rehearsal recordings for Walls and Bridges.

Personnel
 John Lennon: vocals, guitar, piano (side 2), producer (side 1, track 2; side 2)
 Jesse Ed Davis: guitar (side 2)
 Klaus Voormann: bass (side 2)
 Jim Keltner: drums (side 2)
 Phil Spector: producer (side 1, tracks 1, 3–5)

References

John Lennon compilation albums
1986 compilation albums
Capitol Records compilation albums
Parlophone compilation albums
Compilation albums published posthumously
Albums produced by Phil Spector
Albums with cover art by Andy Warhol